Flavia Wasserfallen (born 7 February 1979, Bern) is a Swiss politician of the Social Democratic Party (SP) and a member of the Swiss National Council.

Education 
She was raised in Hinterkappelen and following her graduation from the Gymnasium in 1998, she first became a Snowboardteacher in 1999. In 2000 she enrolled into University of Bern studying political sciences. She absolved an exchange semester  at the University of Bologna within the Erasmus Programme and completed her studies with a Master's degree in 2007.

Professional career 
In 2010 she established a local service who distributes organic vegetables to the city of Bern. She credits this with keeping her in contact with working people.

Political career 
Between 2012 and 2018 she was a member of the Grand Council of Bern and the co-secretary of the SP.  She succeeded Evi Alleman (who was elected into the executive council of Bern) in the National Council in June 2018. After Simonetta Sommaruga announced her resignation from the Federal Council in November 2022, she was considered a potential candidate, but she declined, alleging her envisioned candidacy to the Council of States.

Political views 
She advocates for equal pay and affordable health care. She advocates for better working conditions in relation to the patients and she is the president of the Mother and Father Counseling Association. In September 2020, she was a co-founder of FC Helvetia, the female football team of the Swiss Parliament. In November 2022, Wasserfallen cut her hair in solidarity with the women in Iran, who where protesting against the Government in Iran after the death of Mahsa Amini.

Personal life 
She is married and has three children and has her municipal citizenship in Langnau im Emmental and Ferenbalm.

References 

1979 births
21st-century Swiss women politicians
21st-century Swiss politicians
Living people
Members of the National Council (Switzerland)
Social Democratic Party of Switzerland politicians
University of Bern alumni